Evan "Ianto" Davies (c. 1892 - c. 1946) was a Welsh international rugby union full back who played club rugby for Llanelli and Maesteg. He won a single cap for Wales and also played county rugby for Glamorgan

Rugby career
Born in Maesteg, Wales, Davies first played rugby as a school boy for Plasnewydd School. He progressed to local team Maesteg Rovers, before joining Maesteg RFC. Davies' rugby career was put on hold with the outbreak of World War I, where he served in the Royal Field Artillery and Welch Regiment. On his return to Britain after the end of hostilities, he rejoined Maesteg.

The first game played by the Wales national team after the war was against the touring New Zealand Army. With so many of the pre-war team either too old or now no longer fit to play, the Wales team was made up of newly capped players, many of whom were ex-services. Davies was given his first and only cap in this game, played at the Cardiff Arms Park on 21 April 1919. Although Wales lost 3-6, Davies' cap gave him the honour of being the first player to come from the Maesteg club to represent his country.

For the 1920/21 season, Davies was made captain of Maesteg. He later played for both Llanelli and London Welsh and also for Glamorgan County.

Bibliography

References 

1890s births
1946 deaths
Llanelli RFC players
Rugby union players from Maesteg
Rugby union fullbacks
Wales international rugby union players
Welsh rugby union players
Maesteg RFC players
London Welsh RFC players
Glamorgan County RFC players
British Army personnel of World War I
Welsh miners